Toad Patrol is a Canadian animated series created by George and Peggy Sarson. It premiered on October 2, 1999, on Teletoon and on September 7, 2002, on Toon Disney.

Although it was aimed at young children, it found a following among pre-teens, teens and young adults because the fairly youthful and lighthearted appearance of the show enveloped some rather dark undertones and backgrounds. The story was in unofficial development since 1985, officially beginning when the creators started selling Mistle Toad chocolates and cream pops to raise money.

Toad Patrol was animated in Korea, AKOM (first season) and India, UTV Toons (additional production services, second season only), although much in-betweening was done in Canada at Funbag and Helix studios. It later aired on the French-language Télétoon as La Petite Patrouille, and on the TeleFutura (now UniMás) Spanish-language network as Patrulla de Sapitos. It also aired in Italy on Rai 2 as La pattuglia dei ranocchi.

Story
The story is about a group of eight young "Toadlet" siblings and their struggle for survival in The Great Forest.

The Ancients are quite powerful and knowledgeable in shamanistic like magic. According to legend; they had created Toad Hollow, left many symbols of their existence behind and had eventually disappeared. Now, due to unknown reasons, the Toads have to abandon the forest and migrate to Toad Hollow. Toad Hollow is basically a giant haven, home to many Toads. The only way to enter Toad Hollow is a gateway known as the Fairy Ring. Or at least, this is the only way that will prevent one from becoming a Toadstool after the ring closes. This portal of sorts opens and closes in random areas of the forest annually, and any who miss the Ring end up stranded or turn into a toadstool.

The main characters are late born Toadlets who missed the great migration. Unable to figure out what to do, they are greeted by a wandering Toad sage named Mistle Toad. He tells them about the Fairy Ring and how to find it. It is not known exactly where it is because the location changes every year. It is revealed shortly after that the youngest of the eight toadlets, Panther Cap, has the ability to hear what certain "Lightning Oaks" (called Thunder Trees by the toadlets) are saying, and can also tune into these trees telepathically with the use of an acorn.

Along their journey, every member of the group develops a special skill which they use to contribute to the group's survival. They also meet Earth Star, a young Toadlet musician who was part of a previous group of Toadlets who failed to find the Fairy Ring in time and all turned into Toadstools.

The series lasted two seasons, 13 episodes each. The first follows the Toadlets as they find the Fairy Ring. In the second season, when in Toad Hollow, Panther Cap hears Mistle Toad calling out for help. Eventually after telling the others, they set out to find and rescue him.

Characters

Main Characters
Fur Foot
Beauty Stem
Elf Cup
Shaggy Mane
Puff Ball
Oyster
Slippery Jack
Panther Cap
Earth Star
Mistle Toad

Production
This series was first realized by George and Peggy Sarson in 1985. He created the character of Mistle Toad back then, and penned a series of short stories about Toad Tunnels, tunnels dug in some areas of the world for groups of toads who migrate. The tunnels act as a way to give the Toads a safe passageway past freeways and roads, as this had been known to destroy whole groups of migrating toads before the invention of the tunnels. George found the perilous journey of the toads fascinating, and created a story about it.

Teletoon, at the time not yet launched, commissioned the first season as early as January 1997 for its first batch of original programming. In 2002, the sale of broadcast rights to Disney in the US was announced, along with the production of a second season. A show sponsor page had stated that 13 additional episodes of the series were in production as of 2005.

The first season was produced by AKOM Production Company, while the second season was produced by RME Animation Studios. Slippery Jack is voiced by Brady Moffatt in the first season and not the second season because he is uncredited.

Run for the Toad, a marathon organized by Peggy and George Sarson, used characters from the series for branding and had special events for children where episodes of the show were aired in both English and French.

Episodes

Season 1: Chapters 1–13 (1999–2000)

Season 2: Chapters 14–26 (2002)

Home releases
Three DVDs were released in 2005, each one containing three episodes.

References

External links

The Temple Of Bufonidae
Run For The Toad Website
Song Lyrics Page
Episode Guides
 

1990s Canadian animated television series
2000s Canadian animated television series
1999 Canadian television series debuts
2002 Canadian television series endings
Animated television series about frogs
Teletoon original programming
Canadian children's animated adventure television series
Canadian children's animated fantasy television series
Canadian children's animated comedy television series
Canadian children's animated drama television series
Television series by Universal Television
English-language television shows